State Route 63 (SR 63) is a  long east–west state highway located in the southwestern portion of the U.S. state of Ohio.  The western terminus of SR 63 is at a trumpet interchange with SR 4 on the western outskirts of Monroe.  Its eastern terminus is at a signalized intersection with US 42, SR 48 and SR 123 in downtown Lebanon.

The westernmost portion of SR 63 between SR 4 and I-75 is a four-lane divided highway.  It is signed as Hamilton–Lebanon Road.  From I-75 east to downtown Lebanon, SR 63 is a two-lane route that is signed as Main Street.  Before the construction of the SR 129 freeway between Hamilton and I-75, SR 63 in combination with SR 4 provided the quickest connection between Hamilton and Lebanon.

Route description
Along the way, SR 63 travels through northeastern Butler County and northwestern Warren County.  No part of SR 63 is included within the National Highway System (NHS).  The NHS is a network of highways defined as being most important for the economy, mobility and defense of the country.

History
SR 63 was established in 1927.  Throughout its history, SR 63 has been designated along the same stretch of highway through portions of Butler and Warren Counties, replacing what had been known as SR 125 prior to 1927.

Since its inception, the only major change along the routing of SR 63 is that by 1969, the highway was upgraded from a two-lane route to a four-lane divided highway between SR 4 and I-75.

Major intersections

References

063
063
063